Zsófia Licskai (born October 25, 1993) is a Hungarian basketball player for PEAC-Pécs and the Hungarian national team.

She participated at the EuroBasket Women 2017.

References

1993 births
Living people
Hungarian women's basketball players
People from Kapuvár
Power forwards (basketball)
Sportspeople from Győr-Moson-Sopron County